The 2016 FIM Superstock 1000 Cup was the eighteenth season of the FIM Superstock 1000 Cup, the twelfth held under this name. The championship, a support class to the Superbike World Championship at its European rounds, used 1000 cc motorcycles and was reserved for riders between 16 and 28 years of age. The season was contested over eight races, beginning at Motorland Aragón on 3 April and ending at Circuito de Jerez on 16 October.

Race calendar and results

Entry list

All entries used Pirelli tyres.

Championship standings

Riders' championship

Manufacturers' championship

References

External links

FIM Superstock 1000 Cup seasons
Superstock 1000 Cup
FIM